All the Pain Money Can Buy is the second studio album by American rock band Fastball, released on March 10, 1998, on Hollywood Records. The album includes the hit singles "The Way" (1998), "Fire Escape" (1998), and "Out of My Head" (1999). The album was certified gold by the Recording Industry Association of America (RIAA) in June 1998 and went Platinum in September of the same year, making it Fastball's most successful release.

Track listing
"The Way" – 4:17 (Tony Scalzo)
"Fire Escape" – 3:21 (Miles Zuniga)
"Better Than It Was" – 2:48 (Scalzo)
"Which Way to the Top?" (Featuring Poe) – 3:50 (Zuniga, Jeff Groves)
"Sooner or Later" – 2:39 (Zuniga)
"Warm Fuzzy Feeling" – 1:55 (Scalzo)
"Slow Drag" – 3:37 (Zuniga)
"G.O.D. (Good Old Days)" – 3:31 (Scalzo)
"Charlie, The Methadone Man" – 3:17 (Zuniga)
"Out of My Head" – 2:32 (Scalzo)
"Damaged Goods" – 3:02 (Zuniga)
"Nowhere Road" – 3:25 (Scalzo)
"Sweetwater, Texas" – 3:53 (Zuniga)

Bonus tracks
"Freeloader Freddy"
"This Guy's in Love with You" (Burt Bacharach, Hal David)
"Sweetwater, Texas" (live) (Zuniga)

Bonus tracks (2018 reissue)
"Quit Your Job"
"Freeloader Freddie"
"The Way" (cassette demo)
"Fire Escape" (demo)
"Slow Drag" (demo)
"Sweetwater, Texas" (demo)
"Androgynous"
"This Guy's in Love with You"
"The Way" (unpaved acoustic version)

Personnel
 Tony Scalzo – vocals, bass guitar, keyboards, guitar
 Miles Zuniga – vocals, guitar
 Joey Shuffield – drums, percussion

Charts

Certifications

References

1998 albums
Fastball (band) albums
Hollywood Records albums
Albums produced by Julian Raymond